Kang Ji-hoon (born 6 January 1997) is a South Korean football midfielder who plays for Gangwon FC.

References

1997 births
Living people
Association football midfielders
South Korean footballers
Gangwon FC players
Gimcheon Sangmu FC players
K League 1 players